is a Japanese badminton player, and joined the Unisys team in 2005. Hirobe graduated from the Chuo University. In 2009, he won the Osaka International Challenge tournament in the men's doubles event partnered with Hajime Komiyama. At the Superseries event, He was the semi-finalist of the 2010 Denmark and Korea Open.

Achievements

BWF Grand Prix 
The BWF Grand Prix had two levels, the Grand Prix and Grand Prix Gold. It was a series of badminton tournaments sanctioned by the Badminton World Federation (BWF) and played between 2007 and 2017.

Men's doubles

  BWF Grand Prix Gold tournament
  BWF Grand Prix tournament

BWF International Challenge/Series 
Men's doubles

  BWF International Challenge tournament
  BWF International Series tournament

References

External links 
 

Living people
1982 births
Sportspeople from Fukui Prefecture
Japanese male badminton players
21st-century Japanese people